XB, Xb, xB or xb may refer to:

 XB Browser, a web browser
 Scion xB, an automobile made by Toyota for the United States
 Xbox (console), a video game console produced by Microsoft Corporation
 Exchangeable bond, a type of security (financial asset)
 1973 Ford Falcon XB, a variant of the Australian Ford Falcon automobile
 Pursuit Special, a fictional model of car in the films Mad Max and Mad Max 2: The Road Warrior
 XB, the Aircraft Registration Prefix for Mexican Private Aircraft
 xB, a species designation in the Star Trek universe; see List of Star Trek characters